Cephalodiscida is one of two orders in the class Pterobranchia, which are small, worm-shaped animals. Members belong to the hemichordates. Species in this order are sessile, living in clear water and secrete tubes on the ocean floor.

Taxonomy
The order is a small one, with only two known families, each containing a single genus. The validity of the family Atubaridae, who has only a sole member, is regarded as questionable.

 Order Cephalodiscida Fowler 1892
 Family Cephalodiscidae Harmer 1905
 Genus †Aellograptus Obut 1964
 Genus †Eocephalodiscus Kozlowski 1938 ex Kozlowski 1949
 Genus †Melanostrophus Öpik 1930 ex Öpik 1933
 Genus †Pterobranchites Kozlowski 1967
 Genus Atubaria Sato 1936
 Genus Cephalodiscus M'Intosh 1882

References

Harmer. S. F. 1905. The Pterobranchia ol the Siboga-Expedition. Siboga Exped. Monogr. 26. 1-131

Hemichordates
Deuterostome orders